Inge Solbrig-Combrinck (born Ingeborg Solbig, 1944) is a German actress best known as the German voice of several characters in The Simpsons including Edna Krabappel, Helen Lovejoy, Judge Constance Harm, Crazy Cat Lady, Mona Simpson, Lunchlady Doris, Itchy & Scratchy and a lot of additional voices.
She was married to Ivar Combrinck († 2006) who produced Futurama, Family Guy and The Simpsons in Germany.

Voice acting (selection)

Animated series & movies

Television series & movies

References

External links 
 

1944 births
Living people
German television actresses
German voice actresses